Kapothaka was a technology  demonstrator mini-UAV for reconnaissance. The Kapothaka (also spelled Kapothaha) which means “dove” is believed to be a  predecessor of Nishant UAV system.

History
Following the successful deployment of a remotely piloted vehicle by Israel during Lebanon war in 1982 Aeronautical Development Establishment (ADE) undertook the development of a remotely piloted vehicle kapothaka in 1983  to develop the necessary technologies. During the next 4 years ADE developed a small RPV to validate in-flight video transmission capabilities and to implement ground take off and parachute recovery.

Characteristics
It had a very small, low radar cross-section and was launched from a rail with rocket assistance. It is equipped with TV and panoramic cameras, providing real time imagery intelligence.

This programme enabled ADE to cut teeth on the intricacies of UAV design development and deployment. The endeavour culminated in successful demonstration of aerial reconnaissance using an RPV during Operation Brasstacks in September 1987. Indian Army, impressed by the unique capability provided by an RPV, formulated a "qualitative requirement" for a tactical UAV system for artillery leading to the development of Nishant UAV system.

Specification

See also
DRDO Nishant
List of unmanned aerial vehicles

References

Unmanned aerial vehicles of India
Military equipment of India
Kapothaka